The 8th Asian Cross Country Championships took place on March 12, 2005 in Guiyang, China. Team rankings were decided by a combination of each nation's top three athletes finishing positions.

Medalists

Medal table

References
Results

Asian Cross Country Championships
Asian Cross Country
Asian Cross Country
Asian Cross Country
Sport in Guizhou
International athletics competitions hosted by China